Loudoun Mansion is a historic house located in the Germantown neighborhood of Philadelphia, Pennsylvania.

An example of Federal-style and Greek-revival architecture, the main structure was built by Thomas Armat in 1801 and expanded in 1810.  The Greek portico was built in 1830.  The house stands on one of the highest hills overlooking Philadelphia and the Delaware River from Germantown.  During and after the Battle of Germantown many wounded soldiers were carried to the top of the hill where Loudoun now stands.

The house was donated to the City of Philadelphia in 1939. The house is a contributing property of the Colonial Germantown Historic District. It was badly damaged by a fire in 1993 and is not open to the public.

It is alluded to significantly throughout the novel Loving Day by the African American novelist Mat Johnson.

Sources 
Jenkins, Charles Francis. The Guide Book to Historic Germantown, Prepared for the Site and Relic Society. 1926.
Marion, John Francis. Bicentennial City: Walking Tours of Historic Philadelphia. Princeton: The Pyne Press, 1974.

References 

Houses completed in 1801
Houses in Philadelphia
Historic district contributing properties in Pennsylvania
Germantown, Philadelphia
Houses on the National Register of Historic Places in Philadelphia
1801 establishments in Pennsylvania